Reproduction is the debut studio album released by British synthpop group The Human League. The album was released in 1979 through Virgin Records.

Overview
Reproduction contains nine tracks of electronic/synthpop with some elements of industrial music, and was recorded during six weeks at The Human League's studio in Sheffield. The recordings were co-produced by Colin Thurston, who had previously worked on some key recordings such as Iggy Pop's Lust for Life and Magazine's Secondhand Daylight, and who went on to produce numerous hit albums of the 1980s, most notably for Duran Duran. The album was composed and engineered by The Human League (Oakey/Ware/Marsh) and Bob Last for Virgin Records. The album includes The Human League's cover version of "You've Lost That Lovin' Feelin'", a hit single in 1965 for The Righteous Brothers.

Artwork
The cover shows the feet of a man and two women seemingly standing above a number of naked babies. This was at the instruction of the band, but band member Martyn Ware described how the band's brief was misinterpreted by the record company's art department:

"We said we wanted an image of a glass dancefloor in a discotheque which people were dancing on and beneath this, a lit room full of babies. It was meant to look like a still from a film – like some kind of dystopian vision of the future – but it just looks like they're treading on babies. We were quite upset but at that time, it was too late to change it".

Commercial performance
The album's initial release in October 1979 was a commercial failure, but it was re-issued and entered the charts almost two years later in August 1981, earning a Silver disc by the end of the year and peaking at #34 in early 1982. The album spent a total of 23 weeks in the album chart and was certified Gold by the BPI in 1988.

The only single released from the album was "Empire State Human" which initially failed to chart. It was re-released in June 1980 (with a free single taken from the band's second album, Travelogue) and reached #62. The band's first single from 1978, "Being Boiled", was not included on the original release of Reproduction, but was added as an extra track on all CD issues from the late 1980s onwards. However, a re-recorded version of that single's B-side, "Circus of Death", was included on the album.

Track listing

"Introducing" was originally the B-side of the "Empire State Human" single. The master tape of this recording was probably lost since a digitized vinyl recording was used for the CD. The instrumental "The Dignity of Labour" tracks had been released as an EP in 1979 with "Flexi Disc" (a tongue-in-cheek in-studio meta-conversation between the members of the band and their manager, Bob Last, about their plans to include a flexidisc with their EP and what to put on it). The last two tracks were the A- and B-sides of the band's first single, "Being Boiled", released before they signed to Virgin. The 'Fast Version' (so-called because of the label the single was released on – Fast Product) of "Circus of Death" is shorter than the original single version as it does not have the spoken end of the song.

The original vinyl release of the album included some musique concrète-style vocal recordings, seemingly from the radio or television, between some tracks. Of note, 'knit one, purl one' could be heard on side one. These elements were not included in subsequent CD reissues.

Personnel
The Human League
Philip Oakey – vocals, synthesizer
Ian Craig Marsh – vocals, synthesizer
Martyn Ware – vocals, synthesizer
Philip Adrian Wright – film technician

Charts

Certifications

References

1979 debut albums
The Human League albums
Albums produced by Colin Thurston
Virgin Records albums